Blue Sky and the Devil is the second studio release of Duluth, Minnesota bluegrass group Trampled by Turtles. In 2020, a vinyl edition was released through their record label Banjodad Records. The album was recorded at Dirty Old Town Studios. All song are written by Dave Simonett except for 'Dog On A Leash' and 'Higher Calling' which were both written by Erik Berry. 

Personnel: 

 Banjo, Vocals – Dave Carroll 
 Bass, Vocals – Tim Saxhaug
 Guest, Fiddle – Mary LaPlant
 Guitar, Vocals – Dave Simonett
 Mandolin, Vocals – Erik Berry
 Mastered By – Eric Swanson
 Photography By – Joe Cunningham , Pat Byrne

References

2005 albums
Trampled by Turtles albums